History Will Absolve Me (Spanish: La historia me absolverá) is the title of a two-hour speech made by Fidel Castro on 16 October 1953. Castro made the speech in his own defense in court against the charges brought against him after he led an attack on the Moncada Barracks in Cuba. He reconstructed his allegation in court later in prison, and added phrases and facts that he did not say in court, including History Will Absolve Me. In fact, his last words spoken in court were: "History will definitely tell it all". The speech later became the manifesto of his 26th of July Movement. 

Though sentenced to terms of up to 15 years for their roles in the attack, all of the rebels were released after an amnesty granted by Fulgencio Batista in 1955. Castro relocated to Mexico, before returning to Cuba on the Granma yacht in December 1956.

The speech was secretly printed as a pamphlet by El Curita at Plaza del Vapor which was demolished in 1959 by the Castro government and made into a park named El Curita.

Castro's first court appearance

Castro made his first court appearance on 21 September 1953 in Santiago, as one of around 100 defendants arrested after the Moncada attack. 65 of these had in fact not taken part in the operation and included leading politicians, among them the nation′s last democratically elected president, Carlos Prío. Castro, a qualified lawyer, took on his own defense, as did two other defendants. All others were defended by a total of 24 attorneys. Castro based his case on the illegality of the Batista regime and the inherent right of the citizen to rebel against what he perceived to be an illegal government. When asked who was responsible for the attack, Castro replied that "the intellectual author of this revolution is José Martí, the apostle of our independence". Castro also took part in the court′s second hearing on 22 September, but missed day three (25 September) because the regimental chief had wrongly claimed him to be sick, in an effort to dislodge his defence. Castro managed to have a handwritten note handed to the judge in court asking for special safeguards for his life that he said was under threat in America. The court then decided to proceed with the main trial, instructed for the demands in Castro′s letter to be fulfilled and to grant his separate case a new trial at a later date.

The defense was so successful that only 31 prisoners were found guilty and most were treated leniently. 19 attackers were acquitted along with the 65 civilians. The only two women participants in the attack, who had not been armed, received sentences of 7 months. They had been charged with cat burglary. Along with three others found to have played a leading role in the attack, Castro's brother Raúl was sentenced to 13 years on what was then called the Isle of Pines.

Castro's speech and sentence
 Castro was brought before a different court on 16 October 1953 for sentencing. It was here that he reportedly made his four-hour speech justifying his actions and outlining his plans for Cuba. During the trial, public outrage at the treatment of the prisoners was seriously diminishing Batista's standing among the population. A local judge telephoned Batista's staff to complain that Batista was reviving the brutal era of former president Gerardo Machado, while a Santiago bishop called upon the courts to spare Castro's life and sought support from Cuba's upper class Catholic contingent. Though Castro was sentenced to join his brother in prison for 15 years, the trial elevated him to semi-heroic status on the island.

Details of the Speech
Castro's speech contained numerous evocations of the "father of Cuban independence" José Martí, whilst depicting Batista as a tyrant. According to Castro, Batista was a "monstrum horrendum ... without entrails" who had committed an act of treachery in 1933 when he initiated a coup to oust Cuban president Ramón Grau. Castro went on to speak of "700,000 Cubans without work", launching an attack on Cuba's extant healthcare and schooling, and asserting that 30% of Cuba's farm people could not even write their own names.

In Castro's published manifesto, based on his 1953 speech, he gave details of the "five revolutionary laws" he wished to see implemented on the island:
The reinstatement of the 1940 Cuban constitution.
A reformation of land rights.
The right of industrial workers to a 30% share of company profits.
The right of sugar workers to receive 55% of company profits.
The confiscation of holdings of those found guilty of fraud under previous administrative powers.

See also

Cape Editions
List of speeches

Content notes

Source notes

References
De la Cova, Antonio Rafael, The Moncada Attack: Birth of the Cuban Revolution. Columbia: University of South Carolina Press, 2007. 
Gott, Richard, Cuba: A new history, New Haven: Yale University Press, 2004, pp. 150–152
Skierka, Volker, Fidel Castro: A Biography. Cambridge: Polity, 2004. 
Thomas, Hugh, The Cuban Revolution. London: Weidenfeld and Nicolson, 1971, 1986 (Shortened version of Cuba: The Pursuit of Freedom, includes all history 1952–1970) 
Thomas, Hugh, Cuba: The Pursuit of Freedom. New York: Da Capo Press, 1998.

External links

History Will Absolve Me (The complete speech)

Cuban Revolution
Works by Fidel Castro
1953 in Cuba
1953 speeches
Political quotes